The regional government of the autonomous region of Friuli Venezia Giulia, Italy, has the form of a presidential representative democracy, where the president of the Region is the head of government, and of a multi-party system. Executive power is exercised by the Regional Government. Legislative power is vested in both the government and the Regional Council.

Executive branch

The Regional Government (Giunta Regionale) is presided by the President of the Region (Presidente della Regione), who is elected for a five-year term, and is composed by the President and the Ministers (Assessori), who are currently 10, including a vice president.

List of presidents

Legislative branch

The Regional Council of Friuli-Venezia Giulia (Consiglio Regionale della Friuli-Venezia Giulia) is composed of 60 members and is elected with proportional representation plus a majority premium for the winning coalition. The council is elected for a five-year term, but, if the President suffers a vote of no confidence, resigns or dies, under the simul stabunt vel simul cadent clause (introduced in 2003), also the council will be dissolved and there will be a fresh election.

Local government

Municipalities

Provincial capitals

Other municipalities with more than 15,000 inhabitants

Former Provinces
The provinces were disbanded in 2017–2018.

Parties and elections

Latest regional election

In the latest regional election, which took place on 4 March 2018, Massimiliano Fedriga of the Lega Nord Friuli-Venezia Giulia was elected by a landslide President.

References

External links
Friuli-Venezia Giulia Region
Regional Council of Friuli-Venezia Giulia
Constitution of Friuli-Venezia Giulia

 
Friuli-Venezia Giulia